Elections to the Labour Party's Shadow Cabinet took place on 23 October 1991. Under the rules then in effect, the Commons members of the Parliamentary Labour Party elected 18 members of the Official Opposition Shadow Cabinet, who were then assigned portfolios by the leader. The Commons members of the PLP separately elected the Chief Whip, and the Labour peers elected the Leader of the Opposition in the House of Lords. In addition, the Leader of the Labour Party and Deputy Leader (Neil Kinnock and Roy Hattersley, respectively) were members by virtue of those offices.

The election did not result in any changes to the Shadow Cabinet.

† Multiple candidates tied for position.

References

1991
1991 elections in the United Kingdom
October 1991 events in the United Kingdom